The Producers may refer to:

Music
 The Producers (American band), a new wave and power pop band from Atlanta, Georgia
 The Producers (Trebol Clan album), a collaborative album by Trebol Clan, Dr. Joe & Mr. Frank
 The Trevor Horn Band (previously The Producers), an English supergroup

Visual arts
 The Producers (1967 film), a 1967 satirical black comedy film written and directed by Mel Brooks
 The Producers (musical), a stage musical adapted by Mel Brooks and Thomas Meehan from the 1967 film 
 The Producers (2005 film), a 2005 musical comedy film directed by Susan Stroman based on the stage musical
 "The Producers" (Smash), the twenty eighth episode of the American television series
 The Producers (TV series), a 2015 South Korean television series